Gnojnik  is a village in southern Poland, the seat of the rural gmina (administrative district) of Gmina Gnojnik in Brzesko County, Lesser Poland Voivodeship.

References
Polish official population figures 2006

Villages in Brzesko County